In computing, umask is a command that determines the settings of a mask that controls how file permissions are set for newly created files. It may also affect how the file permissions are changed explicitly.  is also a function that sets the mask, or it may refer to the mask itself, which is formally known as the file mode creation mask. The mask is a grouping of bits, each of which restricts how its corresponding permission is set for newly created files. The bits in the mask may be changed by invoking the  command.

Overview
In Unix-like systems, each file has a set of attributes that control who can read, write or execute it. When a program creates a file, the file permissions are restricted by the mask. If the mask has a bit set to "1", then the corresponding initial file permission will be disabled. A bit set to "0" in the mask means that the corresponding permission will be determined by the program and the file system. In other words, the mask acts as a last-stage filter that strips away permissions as a file is created; each bit that is set to a "1" strips away its corresponding permission. Permissions may be changed later by users and programs using chmod.

Each program (technically called a process) has its own mask and is able to change its settings using a function call. When the process is a shell, the mask is set with the  command. When a shell or process launches a new process, the child process inherits the mask from its parent process. Generally, the mask only affects file permissions during the creation of new files and has no effect when file permissions are changed in existing files; however, the  command will check the mask when the mode options are specified using symbolic mode and a reference to a class of users is not specified.

The mask is stored as a group of bits. It may be represented as binary, octal or symbolic notation. The  command allows the mask to be set as octal (e.g. ) or symbolic (e.g. ) notation.

The  command is used with Unix-like operating systems, and the  function is defined in the POSIX.1 specification.

History
The mask, the  command and the  function were not part of the original implementation of UNIX. The operating system evolved in a relatively small computer-center environment, where security was not an issue. It eventually grew to serve hundreds of users from different organizations. At first, developers made creation modes for key files more restrictive, especially for cases of actual security breaches, but this was not a general solution. The mask and the  command were introduced around 1978, in the seventh edition of the operating system, so it could allow sites, groups and individuals to choose their own defaults. The mask has since been implemented in most, if not all, of the contemporary implementations of Unix-like operating systems.

Shell command
In a shell, the mask is set by using the  command. The syntax of the command is:
umask [-S ] [maskExpression]

(The items within the brackets are optional.)

Displaying the current mask
If the  command is invoked without any arguments, it will display the current mask. The output will be in either octal or symbolic notation, depending on the OS.

In most shells, but not the C shell, the  argument (i.e. ) will instruct  to display using symbolic notation. For example:
$ umask         # display current value (as octal)
0022
$ umask -S      # display current value symbolically
u=rwx,g=rx,o=rx

Setting the mask using octal notation
If the  command is invoked with an octal argument, it will directly set the bits of the mask to that argument:
$ umask 007    # set the mask to 007
$ umask        # display the mask (in octal)
0007           #   0 - special permissions (setuid | setgid | sticky )
               #   0 - (u)ser/owner part of mask
               #   0 - (g)roup part of mask
               #   7 - (o)thers/not-in-group part of mask
$ umask -S     # display the mask symbolically
u=rwx,g=rwx,o=

If fewer than 4 digits are entered, leading zeros are assumed. An error will result if the argument is not a valid octal number or if it has more than 4 digits. The three rightmost octal digits address the "owner", "group" and "other" user classes respectively.  If a fourth digit is present, the leftmost (high-order) digit addresses three additional attributes, the setuid bit, the setgid bit and the sticky bit.

Octal codes

Setting the mask using symbolic notation
When  is invoked using symbolic notation, it will modify or set the flags as specified by the maskExpression with the syntax:

Note that this syntax does not work when using the C shell due to the different behaviour of its built-in  command.

Multiple maskExpressions are separated by commas.

A space terminates the maskExpression(s).

The permissions are applied to different user classes:

The operator specifies how the permission modes of the mask should be adjusted.

The permission-symbols indicate which file permission settings are to be allowed or prohibited by the mask.

For example:
umask u-w
Prohibit write permission from being set for the user. The rest of the flags in the mask are unchanged.

Example of multiple changes:
umask u-w,g=r,o+r

This would set the mask so that it would:
 prohibit the write permission from being set for the user, while leaving the rest of the flags unchanged; 
 allow the read permission to be enabled for the group, while prohibiting write and execute permission for the group;
 allow the read permission to be enabled for others, while leaving the rest of the other flags unchanged.

Command line examples
Here are more examples of using the  command to change the mask:

Example showing effect of :
$ umask -S       # Show the (frequently initial) setting 
u=rwx,g=rx,o=rx
$ gcc hello.c      # compile and create executable file a.out
$ ls -l a.out 
-rwxr-xr-x  1 me  developer  6010 Jul 10 17:10 a.out 
$ # the umask prohibited Write permission for Group and Others
$ ls  > listOfMyFiles    # output file created by redirection does not attempt to set eXecute
$ ls -l listOfMyFiles
-rw-r--r--  1 me  developer  6010 Jul 10 17:14 listOfMyFiles 
$ # the umask prohibited Write permission for Group and Others
$ ############################################################
$ umask u-w  # remove user write permission from umask
$ umask -S
u=rx,g=rx,o=rx
$ ls > protectedListOfFiles
$ ls -l protectedListOfFiles
-r--r--r--  1 me  developer  6010 Jul 10 17:15 protectedListOfFiles 
$ rm protectedListOfFiles
override r--r--r-- me/developer for protectedListOfFiles? 
$ # warning that protectedListOfFiles is not writable, answering Y will remove the file
$ #####################################################################################
$ umask g-r,o-r  # removed group read and other read from mask
$ umask -S
u=rx,g=x,o=x
$ ls > secretListOfFiles
$ ls -l secretListOfFiles
-r--------  1 me  developer  6010 Jul 10 17:16 secretListOfFiles

Mask effect
The mask is applied whenever a file is created. If the mask has a bit set to "1", that means the corresponding file permission will always be disabled when files are subsequently created. A bit set to "0" in the mask means that the corresponding permission will be determined by the requesting process and the OS when files are subsequently created. In other words, the mask acts as a last-stage filter that strips away permissions as a file is created; each bit that is set to a "1" strips away that corresponding permission for the file.

How the mask is applied    

Programmatically, the mask is applied by the OS by first negating (complementing) the mask, and then performing a logical AND with the requested file mode. In the [probably] first UNIX manual to describe its function, the manual says,

Exceptions
Many operating systems do not allow a file to be created with execute permissions. In these environments, newly created files will always have execute permission disabled for all users.

The mask is generally only applied to functions that create a new file; however, there are exceptions. For example:
$ umask 0000
$ chmod +rwx filename
$ ls -l filename
-rwxrwxrwx filename
$ umask 0022
$ chmod +rwx filename
$ ls -l filename
-rwxr-xr-x filename

Processes
Each process has its own mask, which is applied whenever the process creates a new file. When a shell, or any other process, spawns a new process, the child process inherits the mask from its parent process. When the process is a shell, the mask is changed by the  command. As with other processes, any process launched from the shell inherits that shell's mask.

Mount option
In the Linux kernel, the fat, hfs, hpfs, ntfs, and udf file system drivers support a umask mount option, which controls how the disk information is mapped to permissions. This is not the same as the per-process mask described above, although the permissions are calculated in a similar way. Some of these file system drivers also support separate masks for files and directories, using mount options such as fmask.

See also

 File system permissions

References

Unix SUS2008 utilities
IBM i Qshell commands
File system permissions